Jonquil or Jonquille may refer to:

 Narcissus jonquilla, the jonquil, a narcissus with clusters of small fragrant yellow flowers and cylindrical leaves, native to southern Europe and northeastern Africa
 Jonquil (color), a hue named after the flower
 USS Jonquil (1863), a 19th-century warship of the United States Navy
 , two former warships of the Royal Navy